Brian Hall may refer to:

Brian Hall (actor) (1937–1997), English actor
Brian Hall (author) (born 1959), American author
Brian Hall (Yorkshire cricketer) (1929–1989), English cricketer with Yorkshire
Brian Hall (Worcestershire cricketer) (born 1934), English cricketer with Worcestershire
Brian Hall (Bermudian cricketer) (born 1992), Bermudian cricketer
Brian Hall (footballer, born 1946) (1946–2015), Scottish footballer who played for Liverpool
Brian Hall (footballer, born 1939) (1939–2002), English footballer who played for Colchester United
Brian Hall (Australian footballer) (born 1952), Australian rules footballer who played for North Melbourne
Brian Hall (referee) (born 1961), American football (soccer) referee
Brian K. Hall (born 1941), professor of biology
Brian Hall, one of three mountain climbers lost December 2006, summarized at Mount Hood climbing accidents#Incident history
Brian Hall (athlete) (1937–2010), English athlete

See also
Bryan Hall (disambiguation)